Bilal Town is a wealthy northeastern suburb of Abbottabad, Pakistan. It lies between central Abbottabad and Kakul, where the Pakistan military academy is located. The upper-class neighborhood contains some large, sometimes garish houses and open fields and has a high number of retired military officials living in the community.

History
In May 2011, the house of Osama bin Laden was invaded by the US military in the southeastern outskirts of Bilal Town and he was killed.

References

Populated places in Abbottabad District